Tiffany Ellsworth Thayer (March 1, 1902 – August 23, 1959) was an American actor, writer, and one of the founding members of the Fortean Society.

Biography
Born in Freeport, Illinois, Thayer quit school at age 15 and worked as an actor, reporter, and used-book clerk in Chicago, Detroit, and Cleveland. When he was 16, he toured as the teenaged hero in the Civil War drama The Coward. Thayer first contacted American author Charles Fort in 1924. In 1926, Thayer moved to New York City to act, but soon spent more time writing.

In 1931 Thayer co-founded the Fortean Society in New York City to promote Fort's ideas. Primarily based in New York City, the Society was headed by first president Theodore Dreiser, an old friend of Fort who had helped to get his work published. Early members of the original Society in New York City included Booth Tarkington, Ben Hecht, Alexander Woollcott, and H. L. Mencken.  The first 6 issues of Doubt, the Fortean Society's newsletter, were each edited by a different member, starting with Dreiser.  Thayer thereafter took over editorship of subsequent issues. Thayer began to assert extreme control over the society, largely filling the newsletter with articles written by himself, and excommunicating the entire San Francisco chapter, reportedly their largest and most active, after disagreements over the society's direction, and forbidding them to use the name Fortean. During World War II, Thayer used every issue of Doubt to espouse his politics. He celebrated the escape of Gerhart Eisler, and named Garry Davis an Honorary Fellow of the Society for renouncing his American citizenship.  Thayer frequently expressed opposition to Civil Defense, going to such lengths as encouraging readers to turn on their lights in defiance of air raid sirens. In contrast to the spirit of Charles Fort, he dismissed not only flying saucers as nonsense but also the atomic bomb as a hoax by the US government.

Thayer also wrote several novels, including the bestseller Thirteen Women which was filmed in 1932 and released by RKO Radio Pictures. Many of his novels contained elements of science fiction or fantasy, including Dr. Arnoldi about a world where no-one can die.

In the profile in Twentieth Century Authors, Thayer was described as "an atheist, an anarchist – in philosophy a Pyrrhonean – and regrets the legitimacy of his birth." He listed his hobbies as painting, fencing, and book collecting.

The Fortean Society Magazine (also called Doubt) was published regularly until Thayer's death in Nantucket, Massachusetts in 1959, aged 57, when the society and magazine came to an end. The magazine and society are not connected to the present-day magazine Fortean Times.

Writers Paul and Ron Willis, publishers of Anubis, acquired most of the original Fortean Society material and revived the Society as the International Fortean Organization (INFO) in the early 1960s. INFO went on to incorporate in 1965, publish a widely respected magazine, The INFO Journal: Science and the Unknown, for more than 35 years and created the world's first, and most prestigious, conference dedicated to the work and spirit of Charles Fort, the annual FortFest which continues to this day.

Critical reception
Thayer wrote genre romances that were disliked by contemporary literary critics. Dorothy Parker, in a New Yorker review of An American Girl, said "He is beyond question a writer of power; and his power lies in his ability to make sex so thoroughly, graphically, and aggressively unattractive that one is fairly shaken to ponder how little one has been missing." F. Scott Fitzgerald said "curious children nosed at the slime of Mr. Tiffany Thayer in the drug-store libraries." Kunitz and Haycraft cited an anonymous reviewer who described Thayer's work as
"obviously meretricious, but disclosing a narrative gift which might be used to better purpose".  William Tenn, recalling Dr. Arnoldi more than sixty years after he had read it, characterized it as "absolutely fascinating---and disgusting. . . . If you ever find a copy, give it to some sf fan you dislike. Your reward will be the baffled misery in his eyes after he's read it."<ref>[http://www.sfsite.com/fsf/1998/cur9808.htm "Curiosities], F&SF, August 1998</ref>

 Family 
Thayer was married at least twice: beginning around 1931, to Tanagra (1898–1975), a well-known dancer, and later to Katherine McMahon (1914–1999).

Notes

References
Nichols, Lewis, "A Talk With Tiffany Thayer", New York Times, June 10, 1956
Skinner, Doug (Summer 2005) "Doubting Tiffany", Fortean Times

External links
International Fortean Organization
Thirteen Women, by Tiffany Thayer at Neglected Books Page'', February 13, 2011

Fortean Times
Tiffany Thayer Declassified FBI File (17MB), The Black Vault

1902 births
1959 deaths
20th-century American novelists
American atheists
American male novelists
American science fiction writers
American male stage actors
People from Freeport, Illinois
Writers from New York City
Novelists from Illinois
20th-century American male actors
Male actors from New York City
Male actors from Illinois
20th-century American male writers
Novelists from New York (state)